Dan-Issa is a village and rural commune in Niger.

History 
Niger gold mine collapse

References

Communes of Niger